Autenbach is a small river of Bavaria, Germany. It flows into the Aschaff in Waldaschaff. The river is known for timber rafting during the start of the 18th century. The river still contains a dam that was used for the timber rafting. The dam was renovated in 2011.

See also
List of rivers of Bavaria

References

Rivers of Bavaria
Rivers of the Spessart
Rivers of Germany